Agricultural History is a quarterly peer reviewed academic journal published by the American Agricultural History Society. It was established in 1927 and was edited by Claire Strom (Rollins College) until the end of 2016. She was succeeded by Albert Way (Kennesaw State University).

Abstracting and indexing
The journal is abstracted and indexed in:

 L'Année philologique
 AGRICOLA
 Historical Abstracts
 Academic Search Premier
 Arts and Humanities Citation Index
 Science Citation Index Expanded
 Scopus
 Social Sciences Citation Index
 ERIH PLUS
 SCImago Journal Rank

References

External links

Agricultural History at JSTOR; complete text of all back issues 1927-2007

History journals
Publications established in 1927
Quarterly journals
English-language journals
Works about the history of agriculture
History of agriculture in the United States